Waialua is a census-designated place and North Shore community in the Waialua District on the island of Oahu, City & County of Honolulu, Hawaii, United States. As of the 2020 census, the CDP had a population of 4,062.

Waialua was one of the six original districts of ancient Hawaii on the island, known as moku. Waialua is a former (sugar) mill town and residential area, quite different in its quiet ambiance from nearby Haleiwa, which is more commercial and tourist oriented. The Waialua Sugar Mill is the center of this town and the historical base of its plantation history.

The U.S. postal code for Waialua is 96791.

Geography 
Waialua is located at 21°34'31" North, 158°7'46" West (21.575300, -158.129457), southwest of Haleiwa, reached on Waialua Beach Road (State Rte. 82) or Kaukonahua Road (State Rte. 830). Kaukonahua Road turns eastward and, as State Rte. 803 then 801 runs up into the central plateau of Oahu to Wahiawā or (as 803) to Schofield Barracks. Farrington Highway (State Rte. 930) runs westward to Mokulēia.

The total area is 8.30% water.

Demographics 

As of the census of 2000, there were 3,761 people, 1,128 households, and 882 families residing in the CDP. The racial makeup of the CDP was 15.34% White, 0.37% Black or African American, 0.05% Native American, 51.85% Asian, 3.96% Pacific Islander, 1.04% from other races, and 27.39% from two or more races.  6.54% of the population were Hispanic or Latino of any race.

There were 1,128 households, out of which 29.3% had children under the age of 18 living with them, 55.4% were married couples living together, 14.5% had a female householder with no husband present, and 21.8% were non-families. 17.5% of all households were made up of individuals, and 8.3% had someone living alone who was 65 years of age or older.  The average household size was 3.31 and the average family size was 3.71.

In the CDP the population was spread out, with 23.9% under the age of 18, 7.7% from 18 to 24, 26.4% from 25 to 44, 23.1% from 45 to 64, and 18.9% who were 65 years of age or older.  The median age was 39 years.  For every 100 females there were 104.3 males.  For every 100 females age 18 and over, there were 101.3 males.

The median income for a household in the CDP was $46,763, and the median income for a family was $51,801. Males had a median income of $29,607 versus $23,716 for females. The per capita income for the CDP was $17,220.  11.7% of the population and 8.9% of families were below the poverty line.  Out of the total population, 15.0% of those under the age of 18 and 9.0% of those 65 and older were living below the poverty line.

Government and infrastructure 
The United States Postal Service operates the Waialua Post Office at 67-079 Nauahi Street. The postal code is 96791.

In 2017, the state approved NRG Energy, Inc., to build a 49 megawatt solar farm project near Waialua called Kawailoa Solar. HECO will buy electricity from this solar farm at 11 cents per kilowatt-hour (kWh) for 22 years. On September 10, 2019, the 49 megawatt Kawailoa Solar developed by Clearway Energy Group began its operation. Originally started by the developer SunEdison, Hawaiian Electric broke its ties to the firm in February 2016 before SunEdison's bankruptcy proceedings. San Francisco-based Clearway's predecessor, NRG Energy's Community Solar division, took over the project at the end of November 2016. On January 22, 2019, the Clearway Energy Group obtained NRG Community Solar's assets.

Education

Hawaii Department of Education operates public schools. Waialua Elementary School and Waialua High & Intermediate School are in the CDP.

The Roman Catholic Diocese of Honolulu operates St. Michael School, a K-8 school.

Hawaii State Public Library System operates the Waialua Library.

History
Many of the current families living in Waialua are the results of agricultural industry which began in the early 20th century.  There was an increased demand for workers as the industry grew, resulting in workers being brought in from China, Portugal, Japan, Korea, Puerto Rico, Philippines, Spain and other areas.  Upon arriving in Hawaii, many of these workers were assigned to work in the sugarcane plantations in Waialua.  During the late 1980s and into the 1990s, the sugar production decreased as increasing labor and production costs caused producers to move overseas.  Many of the families brought to Waialua during the sugar rush remained here and many of their descendants reside there today.

References

Census-designated places in Honolulu County, Hawaii
Populated coastal places in Hawaii